Up Above the Rock is an album by pianist Ray Bryant recorded and released by Cadet Records in 1968.

Track listing 
All compositions by Ray Bryant except where noted
 "Up Above the Rock" – 2:59
 "Dag Nab It" (Bryant, Richard Evans) – 3:33
 "Quizás, Quizás, Quizás" (Osvaldo Farrés) – 3:18
 "If I Were a Carpenter" (Tim Hardin) – 2:48
 "Little Green Apples" (Bobby Russell) – 3:21
 "I Say a Little Prayer" (Burt Bacharach, Hal David) – 4:45
 "After Hours" (Avery Parrish) – 3:47
 "Where the Wind Blows" – 4:33
 "Five, Six and Seven" (Howard Reynolds) – 3:20
 "Mrs. Robinson" (Paul Simon) – 2:53

Personnel 
Ray Bryant – piano
Dobbie Hiques, Snooky Young (tracks 1-6), Danny Moore (tracks 7-9) – trumpet
Ron Carter – bass
Grady Tate – drums

References 

1968 albums
Ray Bryant albums
Cadet Records albums